The 2022 SGP2 series was the 46th edition of the FIM Individual Under-21 World Championship. It was staged as the SGP2 class of the FIM Speedway Grand Prix series after rights holders Discovery Sports Events took over promotional rights of the competition prior to the start of the season. 

The series was staged over three rounds at Prague, Cardiff and Torun.

Poland's Mateusz Cierniak won the title, winning two of the three rounds in the process. Jan Kvěch finished second with defending champion Jakub Miśkowiak claiming third.

Calendar
The 2022 season consisted of three events.

Final Classification

See also 
 2022 Speedway Grand Prix
 2022 Team Junior World Championship

References 

 
2022
Individual Speedway Junior World Championship